"Nah Nah Nah" is a song by American rapper Kanye West. It was released for digital download and streaming through GOOD Music and Def Jam on October 16, 2020. The song served as the "theme song" for West's presidential campaign launched in July of that year. 

"Nah Nah Nah" was written and produced by West and American record producer Dem Jointz. A remix, featuring fellow rappers DaBaby and 2 Chainz, was released on November 13, 2020. The song was West's second and last single as a lead artist in 2020, following "Wash Us in the Blood" (featuring Travis Scott).

On August 7, 2021, for reasons unknown, both versions of the song were suddenly removed from all streaming services.

Background
On October 14, 2020, Kanye West shared on Twitter a snippet of a song titled "Nah Nah Nah". The clip featured footage of Joaquin Buckley's knockout victory at UFC Fight Island 5 and Star Wars. The song was released after a series of tweets from West celebrating presidential polling results in Kentucky, which later turned out to be fake. It was officially released onto streaming services the night of October 16 after being debuted in full on DJ Pharris’ Power 92 Chicago show.

On October 18, West tweeted a screenshot of a text conversation with DaBaby, teasing that he had recorded a verse for a song. The following day, West posted a snippet of DaBaby's verse. On October 29, West posted a longer snippet to his Twitter account of DaBaby's full verse along with a verse from 2 Chainz. The remix later got officially released onto streaming services on November 13.

Charts

Original

Remix

Release history

References

2020 songs
2020 singles
Kanye West songs
Song recordings produced by Kanye West
Songs written by Kanye West
DaBaby songs
Songs written by DaBaby
2 Chainz songs
Songs written by 2 Chainz
Songs written by Dem Jointz
Songs about hip hop
Songs about the media